The Universal Declaration of the Rights of Peoples was first drafted and elaborated during three round-table conferences that were organized by the Unrepresented Nations and Peoples Organization (UNPO) Tartu Coordination Office on 29–30 August 1998; 31 October – 1 November 1998, and 16–17 April 1999 in Tartu and Otepää, Estonia.

More than forty people participated in the discussions and hundreds of formulations of statements were considered. As a result, the draft of the document was adopted simultaneously in three languages (English, Russian, and Estonian) at the last session on 17 April 1999 in Tartu.

External links
 UNPO's "Universal Declaration of the Rights of Peoples"

Human rights instruments
1999 in Estonia
1999 in international relations
Unrepresented Nations and Peoples Organization
1999 documents